Helen Craik (c. 1751 – 11 June 1825) was a Scottish poet and novelist, and a correspondent of Robert Burns. She praised him for being a "native genius, gay, unique and strong" in an introductory poem to his Glenriddell Manuscripts.

Early life
Helen Craik was born at Arbigland, Kirkbean in the historical county of Kirkcudbrightshire, probably in 1751, as one of the six legitimate children of William Craik (1703–1798), a laird keen to improve a large estate of relatively poor land, and his wife Elizabeth (died 1787), daughter of William Stewart of New Abbey, also near Dumfries.

The naval captain John Paul Jones (1747–1792), who played a prominent part in founding the US navy, was also born at Arbigland. He was rumoured to be Helen Craik's father's illegitimate son. Suppositions that one of her sisters was the novelist Catherine Cuthbertson have not been substantiated. Craik was later to write an account of her father's life and agricultural innovations in the form of two letters to The Farmer's Magazine, published in 1811.

Burns
Craik became a correspondent of Robert Burns. Two of his letters to her have survived. The first, dated 9 August 1790 and written from Ellisland, accompanied manuscript copies of two of his "late Pieces". He also wrote to her expressing admiration for a poem of hers, "Helen", which has since been lost, as has much of her other poetry.

A later generation saw "Wertherism" in her poetry, in the sense that its sentimentalism was influenced by Goethe's epistolary novel The Sorrows of Werther (1774, rev. 1787). Craik was also a friend of the fellow poet Maria Riddell, who was a niece by marriage to Burns's patron Robert Riddell, to whom Craik addressed two poems that survive in manuscript.

Cumberland
However, a breach may have appeared in the Craik family over the purported suicide of a groom on her father's estate. He was locally thought to have been engaged to marry Helen Craik and murdered for that reason by a member of her family. Whether this was true or not, Craik moved abruptly in 1792 from Arbigland to Flimby Hall, Cumberland, which belonged to relatives of hers, and stayed there for the rest of her life.

Novels
If true, those dramatic events are echoed in the five novels of hers published anonymously between 1796 and 1805 by the firm of Minerva Press, best known for sentimental and Gothic fiction. One of them, Adelaide de Narbonne (1800), has been called "perhaps the most impressive" of novels of opinion "in terms of its integration of plot and politics."

Some parallels to Craik's novels have been found in Fanny Burney's novel The Wanderer, set in 1793 and written in the 1790s and intermittently up to its publication in 1814. "Like Burney, Craik does not ultimately support the French Revolution (though she creates some genial revolutionary characters like Corday [in Julia de St. Pierre, 1796]), but rather removes her characters 'from the increasing anarchy prevalent in France' to 'the more peaceful island of Great Britain'" (p. 368).

Julia de Saint Pierre is dedicated to a likewise anonymous family friend. It has a heroine who survives victimization by a degraded mother, by the mother's lover, and by a young man who unexpectedly betrays her. Henry of Northumberland, or The Hermit's Cell (1800), with a gloomy medieval background, is the only one of the five not set in her own time. Adelaide de Narbonne turns the historical Charlotte Corday, assassin of Jean-Paul Marat, into a rational republican. Stella of the North, or The Foundling of the Ship (1802, set in her native Dumfriesshire) features two mysterious babies, one dead and one to be heroine. Her final novel was The Nun and her Daughter, or Memoirs of the Courville Family (1805).

Memorial
Craik eventually inherited a half-share in the Flimby estate, but no part of her father's at Arbigland, which went to a distant male relative, John Hamilton. She died unmarried at Flimby Hall on 11 June 1825. Her obituaries and her memorial in the village church call her a published author in English and French (works in the latter have not survived) and a philanthropist to the poor, a theme that appears in her novels.

See also
List of Minerva Press authors
Minerva Press

References

External links
The text of Stella of the North (1802) in full. Retrieved 29 June 2015.

1751 births
1825 deaths
18th-century British women writers
19th-century British women writers
19th-century British writers
18th-century Scottish writers
19th-century Scottish writers
Scottish novelists
People from Allerdale
Robert Burns